The St. Maurice Formation is a geologic formation in Louisiana. It preserves fossils dating back to the Paleogene period.

See also

 List of fossiliferous stratigraphic units in Louisiana
 Paleontology in Louisiana

References
 

Paleogene Louisiana